Legendary Lovers may refer to:

Legendary Lovers, book series Debbie Macomber
"Legendary Lovers", song by Katy Perry from Prism (Katy Perry album)